Murat Emir (born 31March 1969) is a Turkish ophthalmologist, jurist and politician from the Republican People's Party (CHP) who has served as the Member of Parliament for Ankara (II) since June 2015.

He is a member of the Constitutional Commission of the Grand National Assembly of Turkey for the CHP.

See also
25th Parliament of Turkey
26th Parliament of Turkey

References

External links
 MP profile on the Grand National Assembly website

Contemporary Republican People's Party (Turkey) politicians
Deputies of Ankara
Members of the 25th Parliament of Turkey
Members of the 26th Parliament of Turkey
Living people
Turkish jurists
Turkish ophthalmologists
People from Malatya
1969 births
Ankara University Faculty of Law alumni
Hacettepe University alumni
Heidelberg University alumni